Datamaster or DataMaster may refer to:

IBM Datamaster, IBM System/23 system
Autometric DataMaster, a software by Autometric
Datamaster (database management system), former name of DataEase software